is the sixth studio album by Japanese entertainer Miho Nakayama. Released through King Records on February 10, 1988, the album features the No. 1 single "Catch Me". It was produced by Toshiki Kadomatsu, who composed majority of the album's songs.

The album became Nakayama's second to hit No. 1 on Oricon's albums chart. It sold over 349,000 copies.

Track listing 
All tracks are written and arranged by Toshiki Kadomatsu, except where indicated.

Personnel
 Miho Nakayama – vocals
 Toshiki Kadomatsu – backing vocals
 Yurie Kokubu – backing vocals (B3, B5)
 Hideki Fujisawa – backing vocals (B3, B5)
 Kazumi Miyaura – backing vocals (A2–4, B1–2, B4)
 Jackey – backing vocals (A2–4, B2, B4)
 Hiroshi Sato – backing vocals (A5)
 Yui Masaki – backing vocals (A3, A5)
 Eve – backing vocals (A3)
 Masako Suzuki – backing vocals (B1)

Charts
Weekly charts

Year-end charts

References

External links
 
 
 

1988 albums
Miho Nakayama albums
Japanese-language albums
King Records (Japan) albums